The Loyalty Islands blind snake (Ramphotyphlops willeyi) is a species of snake in the family Typhlopidae. The species is endemic to Melanesia.

Etymology
The specific name, willeyi, is in honor of British-Canadian zoologist Arthur Willey.

Geographic range
R. willeyi is found in the Loyalty Islands on Lifou and Maré, and on the island of New Caledonia.

Habitat

Description
Its length is 32 times its diameter. Its color (in alcohol) is olive-brown dorsally, and yellowish ventrally. There are 22 scale rows around the body.

Reproduction
R. willeyi is oviparous.

References

Further reading
Bauer AM, Vindum JV (1990). "A checklist and key to the herpetofauna of New Caledonia, with remarks on biogeography". Proceedings of the California Academy of Sciences 47 (2): 17–45. (Ramphotyphlops willeyi, new combination, pp. 23, 25, 39).
Boulenger GA (1900). "On a new Blind Snake from Lifu, Loyalty Islands". pp. 603–604. In: Willey A (1900). Zoological Results Based on Material from New Britain, New Guinea, Loyalty Islands and Elsewhere, Collected During the Years 1895, 1896 and 1897. Part V. pp. 531–830. (Typhlops willeyi, new species).
McDowell SB (1974). "A Catalogue of the Snakes of New Guinea and the Solomons, with Special Reference to Those in the Bernice P. Bishop Museum, Part I. Scolecophidia". Journal of Herpetology 8 (1): 1–57. (Typhlina willeyi, new combination, p. 47).

Ramphotyphlops
Reptiles described in 1900